Pakistan Muslim League (Zia-ul-Haq Shaheed) was a political party in Pakistan formed in 2002. It is named after General Zia-ul-Haq, Pakistan's president from 1978 to 1988. With the general elections of 2002, Ijaz-ul-Haq won the National Assembly seat, and merged with the Pervez Musharraf-endorsed Pakistan Muslim League (Q). It gained the federal religious affairs ministry under Haq. After PML-Q was routed following the general elections of 2008, PML(Z) separated from the larger party in February 2010.

In March 2010, PML(Z) successfully contested by-elections held in Bahawalnagar for Member of the Punjab Provincial Assembly, upsetting the Pakistan Peoples Party. During the floods of 2010, the party also came to national attention for distributing relief goods worth millions of rupees in Southern Punjab.

On October 9, 2011, PML(Z) became the only party to support the PML(N)'s threat to dissolve the Punjab Assembly and pre-empt the PPP's expected victory in the 2012 Senate elections. In the general elections in 2013, PML(Z) contested two seats and won again from NA-191 Bahawalnagar in the National Assembly, and two seats in the Punjab Assembly. Haq's constituency NA-191 recorded the highest voter turnout in the country for 2013.

In March, 2023, Ijaz-ul-Haq announced the party's merger into the Pakistan Tehreek-e-Insaf.

Electoral history

National Assembly elections

References

Islamic political parties in Pakistan
Muslim League
Muslim League breakaway groups
Political parties in Pakistan
P
Political parties established in 2002
2002 establishments in Pakistan
Pakistani nationalism